Julian Szekely (November 23, 1934 – December 7, 1995) was a Hungarian-American chemical engineer and materials scientist. He was a professor of materials science and engineering at the Massachusetts Institute of Technology.

Born in Budapest, Hungary, Szekely received both his BSc (1959) and PhD (1961) in chemical engineering from Imperial College London. He moved to the United States in 1966, becoming a US citizen in 1972.

References 

1934 births
1995 deaths
Engineering academics
American chemical engineers
MIT School of Engineering faculty
University at Buffalo faculty
Academics of Imperial College London
Alumni of Imperial College London
Hungarian emigrants to the United States
Engineers from Budapest
20th-century American engineers
Fellows of the Minerals, Metals & Materials Society